Stanton Township is a civil township of Houghton County in the Upper Peninsula of the U.S. state of Michigan. The population was 1,590 at the 2020 census. Stanton Township has the distinction of having the highest concentration of people with Finnish ancestry of any place in the United States, at 47%.

Geography

Communities
 Beacon Hill is an unincorporated community in the township. It was a center of the Trimountain Mining Company, largely backed by Boston financiers, and the settlement was named after Beacon Hill neighborhood in that city. It was a station on the Copper Range Railroad. A post office operated from December 11, 1901, until August 31, 1952.
 Craig Roy was platted as a village in 1903 but never developed.
 Coles Creek is located, in part, in the township; the rest is located in neighbouring Adams Township.
Edgemere is a hamlet a mile west of Redridge and one-half mile from Beacon Hill. It was the home of the copper stamp mill of the Adventure Mine and Adventure Mining Company.
 Freda is an unincorporated community in the township and was the site of the Champion stamp mill.
 Liminga is an unincorporated community in the township.
 Obenhoff is an unincorporated community in the township.
 Onnela is an unincorporated community in the township. Onnela is a Finnish name meaning "a place of happiness"; Onni = happiness. The first settler was Iisakki Tolonen from Matarenki, Finland, who settled in 1886. Two years later arrived Heikki Lampinen from Matarenki, Joonas Kovala from Suomussalmi, and Paul Räisänen from Pudasjoki.
 Oskar is an unincorporated community in the township. It was named for Oskar Eliasson (or Eliasen), a Finn who first came to Hancock Township about 1870 and became a charcoal tycoon. He was appointed the first postmaster of the settlement. A post office operated from February 2, 1888, until October 15, 1928.
 Redridge is an unincorporated community in the township. The Redridge Steel Dam is perhaps the most well-known landmark in Redridge. The area was the site of the Atlantic and Baltic stamp mills.            
 Schmidt Corner is an unincorporated community in the township

Parks
 North Canal Township Park at the north end of the Keweenaw Canal and is across from McLain State Park.

Demographics

As of the census of 2000, there were 1,268 people, 475 households, and 315 families residing in the township.  The population density was 10.4 per square mile (4.0/km).  There were 695 housing units at an average density of 5.7 per square mile (2.2/km).  The racial makeup of the township was 98.19% White, 0.24% African American, 0.55% Native American, and 1.03% from two or more races. Hispanic or Latino of any race were 0.55% of the population. Some 46.9% of Stanton Township residents report Finnish ancestry, the highest such percentage in the United States.

There were 475 households, out of which 29.9% had children under the age of 18 living with them, 56.4% were married couples living together, 6.7% had a female householder with no husband present, and 33.5% were non-families. 28.4% of all households were made up of individuals, and 9.3% had someone living alone who was 65 years of age or older.  The average household size was 2.67 and the average family size was 3.36.

In the township the population was spread out, with 30.1% under the age of 18, 8.2% from 18 to 24, 22.6% from 25 to 44, 25.4% from 45 to 64, and 13.6% who were 65 years of age or older.  The median age was 38 years. For every 100 females, there were 111.3 males.  For every 100 females age 18 and over, there were 120.4 males.

The median income for a household in the township was $38,200, and the median income for a family was $41,771. Males had a median income of $35,455 versus $26,875 for females. The per capita income for the township was $16,338.  About 5.1% of families and 7.1% of the population were below the poverty line, including 7.1% of those under age 18 and 4.3% of those age 65 or over.

References

External links
 township data from city-data.com
  Picture of a "herd of contented Holsteins graz[ing] in an oat pasture on the Wayne Rautio farm" at Obenhoff from Keweenaw Digital Archives, Michigan Technological University
  "Farmer Wayne Rautio holds some brome forage from the field on his farm in Obenhoff."

Townships in Houghton County, Michigan
Houghton micropolitan area, Michigan
Townships in Michigan
1902 establishments in Michigan
Populated places established in 1902